Saw Diga was the father of King Mohnyin Thado of Ava. He was a 14th-century governor of Mye-Ne (present-day Nyaung U in central Myanmar). His descendants became kings of Ava down to 1527. He was also a nine-times great-grandfather of King Alaungpaya of the Konbaung dynasty.

Ancestry
The following is his ancestry according to the Alaungpaya Ayedawbon chronicle. Note that his two times great-grandmother Pwa Gyi was a daughter of King Uzana of Pagan, and his two times great-grandfather Yanda Pyissi was a son of Yazathingyan, the chief minister of Pagan.

References

Bibliography
 
 
 

Ava dynasty